The seventh season of the German singing competition The Masked Singer premiered on 1 October 2022 on ProSieben. Ruth Moschner returned to the panel and Matthias Opdenhövel also returned as host.

Panelists and host

TV Presenter Ruth Moschner returned for her sixth season as panelists. Matthias Opdenhövel returned for his seventh season as host.

As in previous seasons, a spin-off show named The Masked Singer - red. Special aired after each live episode, hosted by Viviane Geppert for the first and third episodes, Annemarie Carpendale for the second, fourth and sixth episodes and Rebecca Mir for the fifth episode.

Guest panelists
Various guest panelists appeared as the second and third judge in the judging panel for one episode. These guest panelists included:

Contestants
The season features 9 contestants, one less than previous seasons.

Episodes

Week 1 (1 October)

Week 2 (8 October)

Week 3 (15 October)

Week 4 (22 October)

Week 5 (29 October) - Semi-final

Week 6 (5 November) - Final
 Group number: "Beautiful Day" by U2

Round One

Round Two

Round Three

Reception

Ratings

References

External links
 

2022 German television seasons
The Masked Singer (German TV series)